Ali Gohar Khan Baloch is a Pakistani politician who has been a member of the National Assembly of Pakistan since October 2018.

Political career
Khan was elected to the National Assembly of Pakistan as a candidate of Pakistan Muslim League (N) (PML-N) from Constituency NA-103 (Faisalabad-III) in 2018 Pakistani by-elections held on 14 October 2018.

References

Living people
Pakistan Muslim League (N) MNAs
Pakistani MNAs 2018–2023
Year of birth missing (living people)